House of Sugar is the eighth studio album by American musician Alex G, released on September 13, 2019, through Domino Recording Company.

The album's title is a reference to both the SugarHouse Casino in Philadelphia and the gingerbread house from "Hansel and Gretel".

Recording
House of Sugar was recorded in New York City and Alex's home in Philadelphia, except for "SugarHouse (Live)" which was recorded at Duck Room at Blueberry Hill in St. Louis, Missouri on November 6, 2018. Drums for "Walk Away", "Hope", "Taking" and "Crime" were recorded at PUDH II. Drums for "Near" were recorded at The Acchione's in Philadelphia.

Release
Alex G debuted on Billboards Emerging Artists chart following release of House of Sugar. The album appeared on a number of Billboard charts, including reaching the number 5 spot on the Heatseekers Albums chart as well as number 3 on Vinyl Albums, number 20 on Rock Album Sales and number 43 on Top Album Sales with 5,000 equivalent album units earned.

Critical reception

At Metacritic, which assigns a normalized rating out of 100 to reviews from mainstream publications, House of Sugar received an average score of 86, based on 16 reviews, indicating "universal acclaim".

Hannah Flint of Q praised the album's musical variation, commenting, "At first, House of Sugar can make you feel like you accidentally left the shuffle button on but, a few listens in, it's those twists and turns that make it such a satisfying listen."

Accolades

Track listing

Personnel
Credits adapted from the liner notes of House of Sugar.

 Alexander Giannascoli – songwriting, production, engineering
 Samuel Acchione – guitar , electric guitar , vocals 
 Colin Acchione – bass 
 John Heywood – bass 
 Tom Kelly – drums 
 David Allen Scoli – saxophone 
 Molly Germer – violin , vocals 
 Emily Yacina – vocals 
 Rachel Giannascoli – vocals , album art
 Jacob Portrait – mixing, engineering [drums] 
 Harrison Fore – engineering
 Heba Kadry – mastering
 Chris Bellman – lacquer cut
 David Allen Scoli – insert drawing

Charts

References

2019 albums
Alex G albums
Domino Recording Company albums